Dual Universe is a first person based space simulation sandbox massively multiplayer online role-playing game developed by the Paris-based game development studio, Novaquark.

It is reported to combine elements of Eve Online and Star Citizen, as well as Minecraft, No Man's Sky, and Space Engineers. The game is set in a continuous single-shard universe, wherein players are able to fully edit the environment by building structures and altering terrain, as well as being given the ability to script the components within vehicles and other player-built objects. A heavy focus is also placed on allowing for collective social gameplay involving exploration, mining, crafting, trade, politics and warfare.

It relies on a server technology that Novaquark has termed a CSSC (Continuous Single-Shard Cluster), which allows all players to play the game simultaneously together in the same universe without the need for  instancing of player zones or loading screens.

Background 
The backstory of the game begins in the year 2027, with the discovery of a neutron star on a collision course for Earth's Solar System.

Human civilization has 498 years to develop a plan to leave Earth and find new planets to inhabit, and after centuries of research and development, several Arkships (extremely large and resilient space-faring vehicles) were built to carry millions of passengers in cryosleep to the farthest reaches of the Milky Way Galaxy.

During the year 2510 the first Arkships began to flee the Earth heading towards different areas of the galaxy. As the Arkships traveled on their way to their final destinations, the neutron star discovered in the year 2027 destroyed Earth's solar system and all the planets within.

In the year 12477 one of the Arkships, the Novark, arrives on the earth-like planet Alioth, planting itself firmly into the ground. It is from this Arkship that all players will enter the game for the first time.

Gameplay and features 
The game takes place in a "single continuous, undivided universe" and is played in first person. It is built on the so-called "CSSC" (Continuous Single-Shard Cluster) technology, through which all players interact in a single world. This entails no separate servers, loading screens or instances, such as with other MMOs. It utilizes the Unigine 2 64-bit rendering engine.

Dual Universe offers the potential of virtually unlimited procedurally generated planets, provided by Novaquark's in-house engine.

The game world has been described as being designed to be a "wide-open, fully-moddable experience" to be shared by all its players in a simultaneous manner.  There will reportedly be no NPC characters or AI creatures so it will be up to PVP to supply the action for players.  As a sandbox game, players are able to alter the game world in physical, political and economical aspects. They are able to build ships, houses, space stations as well as cities in a free-form manner. At the same time, they can opt to cooperate in the development of political systems and economies, as well as wage war (e.g. to steal resources by force) and thus alter the balance of power. According to Jean-Christophe Baillie: "We don't create the content; players do."

Central to the game is the ability to remove (or add) matter to the landscape to harvest raw mineral resources, which in turn must be refined for use in various crafting recipes.  The ability to modify the game world is built around the basis of  voxels, providing it its sandbox nature from a physical point of view. Players may also craft and manipulate anything in its world, from small objects such as weapons to cities and comparably large structures. Players may also construct space stations.

The game's autonomous systems (such as engines or computer consoles) rely on energy consumption and the interconnection among machinery, and may be scripted by players using the Lua programming language. Players will also be able to manage the functions of their ships, such as navigation or weapon systems, and AI for use in constructions is expected to be developed by players using Lua.

As the game is designed exclusively for multiplayer, players may take on and specialize in different tasks that may prove to be valuable, such as building, mining, piracy, construction, etc. Many more roles are expected to emerge mostly out of the players' mutual interactions. Novaquark has stated "ideologies, powers, ideas and gameplays" will all play a part in the final release.

The game economy is reported to be influenced by player interactions. The exchange of harvested goods is governed by a market economy. A player will be able to build a company and perform marketing and logistics, among other sandbox activities.

Development 
Novaquark formed in 2014 with Ubisoft, Sony, Apple and Aldebaran Robotics former employees. Jean-Christophe Baillie, Novaquark's original CEO, claims to have originated the idea for Dual Universe in 2011.

The game was revealed in May 2016 in its pre-alpha state, with the subsequent release of a brief teaser trailer following E3. The game entered a closed alpha stage in September 2017, with an updated development roadmap planned to be released in Summer of 2018.

The community site for the game launched in July 2016, allowing players to form organizations.

The funding of the game partly comes from a Kickstarter campaign, completed in October 2016, which secured €565,983 from over 8000 backers in addition to several early-stage investors.

As of May 2018, the game has been in a feature freeze to focus on server and client stability, until later in the month when a new build is planned to be released that will introduce resource scanning and mining, trading, and a revamp of piloting mechanics.

As of August 2020, the game has now entered Beta officially.

Community 
Despite the game currently existing in Alpha since 2016, a large multi-organizational community has existed outside the game world, attracting members from other longstanding MMO games. The community currently contributes to the in-game lore through various off-site forums, Discord servers, and Reddit pages.

See also 
 List of space flight simulation games

References

External links 

2022 video games
Science fiction video games
Space massively multiplayer online role-playing games
Space simulators
Video games developed in France
Video games set on fictional planets
Video games with voxel graphics
Windows-only games
Windows games